The Leerdam railway station is located in the western Netherlands, on the MerwedeLingelijn line between Dordrecht and Geldermalsen. The railway station was opened on 1 December 1883. Train services are operated by Qbuzz.

History
A new station building was opened in 1987, next to the former building. It was designed by Cees Douma. The former building was maintained and is currently being turned into a restaurant.

Arriva operated the service until 8 December 2018.

Train services

Bus services

External links
Qbuzz website 
Dutch Public Transport journey planner 

Railway stations in Utrecht (province)
Railway stations opened in 1883
Railway stations on the Merwede-Lingelijn
Vijfheerenlanden

de:Leerdam#Bahnhof Leerdam